Kobalt is a line of hand and mechanics' tools, power tools, and tool storage products owned by the American home improvement chain Lowe's. It is the house brand for both Lowe's in North America and their joint venture with the now defunct Masters Home Improvement in Australia.

History 

Lowe's and manufacturing partner J.H. Williams launched Kobalt in 1998, with the intention of competing against rival retailers Sears and The Home Depot and their respective Craftsman and Husky tool brands.

In 2003, the Danaher Corporation began producing the majority of Kobalt hand tools.

In 2011, Lowe's ended its arrangement with Danaher and switched to a different supplier for its mechanic's hand tools, JS Products of Las Vegas, Nevada. Screwdrivers continue to be supplied by Great Neck. The same year, the Kobalt line expanded to include cordless power tools, manufactured by Chervon.  The current   (2020) miter saws are manufactured by Rexon Industrial Corp. Taiwan. In 2019 Lowe’s announced that they will launch the Kobalt XTR power tools .

Budget brands 

Lowe's has two brands of tools and supplies positioned below Kobalt in quality and cost: Project Source and the more recent Blue Hawk, introduced in 2009.

Gallery

See also 
 Kobalt 400—A NASCAR race sponsored by Lowe's

References

External links 
 

Lowe's
Store brands
Tool manufacturing companies of the United States